Acanthus hirsutus is a species of flowering plant in the Acanthaceae family.

It contains the glycosides hirsutusoide (2-(o-hydroxyphenyl)-2-hydroxyethenyl-O-beta-glucopyranoside), luteolin-7-O-beta-D-glucuronide, beta-sitosterol-3-O-beta-D-glucopyranoside and (2R)-2-O-beta-D-glucopyranosyl-2H-1,4-benzoxazin-3(4H)-one.

References

External links 

hirsutus
Taxa named by Pierre Edmond Boissier